Charles Quinto (born February 12, 1990) is a Colombian footballer who played domestically for Millonarios and for Peruvian clubs Sport Huancayo, Atlético Torino, Alianza Universidad and Alianza Atlético.

References

1990 births
Living people
Footballers from Bogotá
Colombian footballers
Association football defenders
Millonarios F.C. players
Sport Huancayo footballers
Atlético Torino footballers
Alianza Universidad footballers
Alianza Atlético footballers
Colombian expatriate footballers
Expatriate footballers in Peru
21st-century Colombian people